Photo London is an annual photography event held at Somerset House in London in May. Galleries and publishers show and sell work by photographers, and there are curated exhibitions and talks. Awards are also given.

It was established in 2004 and ran until 2006 at the Royal Academy of Arts, then at Old Billingsgate in 2007, then stopped. It was relaunched in 2015 and has since been held at Somerset House.

Details
Photo London was established in 2004 by Daniel Newburg and held at the Royal Academy of Arts in 2004, 2005 and 2006. In November 2006 it was purchased by Reed Exhibitions (who also owned Paris Photo). Reed ran it, with Newburg acting as creative director, in 2007 at Old Billingsgate and then stopped. Photo London was re-launched in 2015 by a company Candlestar, led by Michael Benson and Fariba Farshad. It took place from 9 to 12 September 2021.

At Photo London, galleries and publishers show and sell work by photographers, and there are curated exhibitions and talks.

Awards
The following awards are given as part of Photo London:
Kraszna-Krausz Book Awards
La Fabrica Book Dummy Award
Mack First Book Award
Magnum Photos Graduate Photographers Award
Photo London Master of Photography Award
2015: Sebastião Salgado
2016: Don McCullin
2017: Taryn Simon
2018: Edward Burtynsky
2019: Stephen Shore
Photo London Artproof Award

Simultaneous events
Other photography events held at the same time in London include the Prix Pictet exhibition at the Victoria and Albert Museum, the Deutsche Börse Photography Prize exhibition at The Photographers' Gallery, the Peckham 24 photography festival in south-east London, and Offprint, an independent photobook publishers' fair at Tate Modern.

See also
Brighton Photo Biennial
Paris Photo

References

External links

2004 establishments in England
2007 disestablishments in England
2015 establishments in England
Festivals established in 2015
Annual events in London
Art museums and galleries in London
Arts festivals in England
Photography festivals
Photography exhibitions
Photography in the United Kingdom